Nikolai Ivanovich Ivanov was a Soviet MiG-15 pilot and flying ace during the Korean war, with 6 victories.

He was the chairman of the Karelian Communist Party when the Karelian SSR was still a Soviet republic.

See also 
List of Korean War flying aces

References

Sources

External links
Ivanov, Nikolay Ivanovich 

Disputed flying aces
Russian aviators
Soviet Korean War flying aces
Soviet military personnel of the Korean War